is an amusement park in Kuwana, Mie, Japan. It features several roller coasters, thrill rides, and kid rides, a giant Ferris wheel, a water park, and 3 official hotels. As of 2012, Nagashima Spa Land is the 18th most visited amusement park in the world.

Ferris wheel

Nagashima Spa Land is the home of Aurora Wheel, a giant Ferris wheel.

Roller coasters
Existing roller coasters:
Acrobat 
Arashi
Children Coaster
Corkscrew
Hakugei
Jet Coaster
Looping Star
Peter Rabbit Coaster
Shuttle Loop
Steel Dragon 2000
Ultra Twister
Wild Mouse, two mirror image tracks

Nearby attractions

Yuami-no-Shima 

This is another Hot Spring (onsen) theme park located at Nagashima Spa Land. It is the largest theme park of its kind in Japan (onsen theme park), where you can enjoy up to 16 natural onsen.

Nabana-no-Sato 

This is a nearby botanical garden known for its beautiful illumination. During spring time, tulips and dahlias bloom all over. During winter time, the LED light display is extremely popular with the tourists.

Incidents
On October 19, 2003 - Steel Dragon 2000 - A train lost a wheel, resulting in a guest in the water park suffering a broken hip. The ride was closed until sturdier wheels were installed and it reopened in 2006.

Transport links
Access by bus is from Kuwana Station or Meitetsu Bus Center; there are no services from Nagashima Station or Kintetsu Nagashima Station.

References

External links

 
 (English translation by Google)
Mie Prefecture tourism guide to Nagashima Spa Land
Roller Coaster Database listing for Nagashima Spa Land
http://www.tartoinjapan.com/photos/20061111_nagashima/spaland_2.jpg

Amusement parks in Japan
Water parks in Japan
Buildings and structures in Mie Prefecture
Tourist attractions in Mie Prefecture
1966 establishments in Japan
Amusement parks opened in 1966
Kuwana, Mie

Although this is very fun Jayson Tatum is still hot